George William Whitehurst (born March 12, 1925) is an American former journalist and politician who served in the United States House of Representatives from the commonwealth of Virginia. He began his career as a professor at the Norfolk campus of the College of William and Mary, which became Old Dominion College in 1962. After serving as Dean of Students from 1963–1968, Whitehurst left academia for a nineteen-year stay in Congress. Upon retiring from politics, he returned to what was by then Old Dominion University, where he currently holds the chair of Kaufman Lecturer in Public Affairs.

Early life
George William "Dr. Bill" Whitehurst was born in Norfolk, Virginia on March 12, 1925. Graduating from Maury High School in 1942, he served in the United States Navy as an aviation radioman in the Pacific Theater, from 1943 to 1946.

Whitehurst received his bachelor's degree in history from Washington and Lee University in 1950, and his master's degree, also in history, from the University of Virginia in 1951. In 1962, Whitehurst received his Ph.D. in American Diplomatic History from West Virginia University. While attending Washington and Lee University he joined the Delta Upsilon fraternity. He currently serves on the board of directors for Delta Upsilon fraternity. He was an active faculty member at the Norfolk Division of William & Mary in 1950, and was on hand when the Division became an autonomous four-year institution, Old Dominion College, in 1962. He stepped down in 1968 to run for Congress.

Congressional career
 
Whitehurst was elected to Congress in 1968 as a Republican from a district based in the Hampton Roads area. He was the first Republican to represent that part of Virginia since the Great Depression, and only the second Republican elected to a full term from that district in the 20th century.

He was re-elected eight more times without serious difficulty. In 1974, for instance, even as Republicans were swept out in the face of voter anger over Watergate, Whitehurst still won comfortably with almost 60 percent of the vote. The Democrats didn't even put up a candidate from 1978 to 1984, and on three of those occasions Whitehurst was completely unopposed. In 1986, Whitehurst stated his support of naturalization of Filipinos who were serving in the United States Navy. He retired in 1987 after declining to run for a tenth term.

For most of his tenure in Congress, he served on the Armed Services Committee. He also served on the Select Committee on Intelligence and the Ethics Committee.

After his service in Congress, Whitehurst returned as a faculty member at Old Dominion University in 1987, where he still teaches.

He also served for many years as an analyst for WTKR in Norfolk. He is also an active United Methodist and has served on the Board of Visitors of the Tidewater Wesley Foundation, the United Methodist Campus Ministry at Old Dominion University, for many years.

Electoral history

1968; Whitehurst defeated Democrat Frederick T. Stant winning 54.21% of the vote.
1970; Whitehurst defeated Democrat Joseph T. Fitzpatrick winning 61.71% of the vote.
1972; Whitehurst defeated Democrat L. Charles Burlage winning 73.45% of the vote.
1974; Whitehurst defeated Democrat Robert R. Richards winning 59.99% of the vote.
1976; Whitehurst defeated Democrat Robert Everett Washington winning 65.69% of the vote.
1978; Whitehurst was unopposed for re-election.
1980; Whitehurst defeated Independent Kenneth Morrison winning 89.84% of the vote.
1982; Whitehurst was unopposed for re-election.
1984; Whitehurst was unopposed for re-election.

2016 Presidential Election

On October 6, 2016, Whitehurst, along with other Republican former members of Congress, was co-signator of a letter opposing Donald J. Trump's candidacy for the office of president.  Although the letter did not officially endorse Hillary Rodham Clinton or any other candidate, it did state that "our party’s nominee this year is a man who makes a mockery of the principles and values we have cherished and which we sought to represent in Congress.”

2020 Presidential Election

On August 24, 2020, Whitehurst was one of 24 former Republican lawmakers to endorse Democratic nominee Joe Biden on the opening day of the Republican National Convention.

References

Further reading
Whitehurst, G. William. Diary of a Congressman. 2 vols. Norfolk: The Donning Company, 1983, 1985.

External links

Biographical Directory of the United States Congress
Profile , Old Dominion University
Alumni Recognition Award Recipients for 2004 , West Virginia University

1925 births
Living people
United States Navy personnel of World War II
American television news anchors
College of William & Mary faculty
Old Dominion University faculty
Politicians from Norfolk, Virginia
Military personnel from Virginia
United States Navy sailors
University of Virginia alumni
Washington and Lee University alumni
West Virginia University alumni
Republican Party members of the United States House of Representatives from Virginia